New York City's 19th City Council district is one of 51 districts in the New York City Council. It is currently represented by Republican Vickie Paladino, who took office in 2022.

Geography
District 19 covers neighborhoods along the shoreline of far eastern Queens, including Auburndale, College Point, Whitestone, Bay Terrace, Beechhurst, and parts of Flushing, Bayside, and Douglaston–Little Neck.

The district overlaps with Queens Community Boards 7 and 11, and with New York's 3rd, 6th, and 14th congressional districts. It also overlaps with the 11th and 16th districts of the New York State Senate, and with the 25th, 26th, 27th, and 40th districts of the New York State Assembly.

Recent election results

2021
In 2019, voters in New York City approved Ballot Question 1, which implemented ranked-choice voting in all local elections. Under the new system, voters have the option to rank up to five candidates for every local office. Voters whose first-choice candidates fare poorly will have their votes redistributed to other candidates in their ranking until one candidate surpasses the 50 percent threshold. If one candidate surpasses 50 percent in first-choice votes, then ranked-choice tabulations will not occur.

2017

2013

References

New York City Council districts